Rosa × damascena (Latin for damascene rose), more commonly known as the Damask rose, or sometimes as the Bulgarian rose, Turkish rose, Taif rose, Arab rose, Ispahan rose and Castile rose, is a rose hybrid, derived from Rosa gallica and Rosa moschata. DNA analysis has shown that a third species, Rosa fedtschenkoana, has made some genetic contributions to the Damask rose.

The flowers are renowned for their fine fragrance, and are commercially harvested for rose oil (either "rose otto" or "rose absolute") used in perfumery and to make rose water and "rose concrete". The flower petals are also edible.  They may be used to flavor food, as a garnish, as an herbal tea, and preserved in sugar as gulkand.

Description 
The leaves are pinnate, with five (rarely seven) leaflets. The roses are a light to moderate pink to light red. The relatively small flowers grow in groups. The bush has an informal shape. It is considered an important type of Old Rose, and also important for its prominent place in the pedigree of many other types.

Varieties 
The hybrid is divided in two varieties:
Summer Damasks (R. × damascena nothovar. damascena) have a short flowering season, only in the summer. 
Autumn Damasks (R. × damascena nothovar. semperflorens (Duhamel) Rowley) have a longer flowering season, extending into the autumn; they are otherwise not distinguishable from the summer damasks.

The hybrid Rosa × centifolia is derived in part from Rosa × damascena, as are Bourbon, Portland and hybrid perpetual roses.

The cultivar known as Rosa gallica forma trigintipetala or Rosa damascena 'Trigintipetala' is considered to be a synonym of  Rosa × damascena.

'Celsiana' is a flowering semi-double variety.

History 

Rosa × damascena is a cultivated flower that is not found growing wild. Recent genetic tests indicate that it is a hybrid of R. moschata x R. gallica crossed with the pollen of Rosa fedtschenkoana, which indicates a probable origin in the foothills of central Asia or Iran.

The French Crusader Robert de Brie, who took part in the Siege of Damascus in 1148 at the second crusade, is sometimes credited for bringing the Damask rose from Syria to Europe. The name of the rose refers to the city of Damascus in Syria, known for its steel (Damask steel), fabrics (Damask) and roses.

roses were a gift from Persia to the entire world. They remained native to Persia and its nearby territories for a long time. The yellow Persian rose was the first variety of the flower to be traded, reaching Vienna sometime in the 16th century. From there, it slowly gained prominence across Europe and the world for its color and fragrance.

Other accounts state that the ancient Romans brought it to their colonies in England, and a third account is that the physician of King Henry VIII gifted him one circa 1540.

There is a history of fragrance production in Kabul Province of Afghanistan from the Damask rose. An attempt has been made to restore this industry as an alternative for farmers who produce opium.

The flower, known in Hawaiian as Lokelani, is the official flower of the Island of Maui.

Nirad Chaudhuri, the Bengali writer, recalls that Hindus in East Bengal did not cultivate it because it was "looked upon as an Islamic flower".

Cultivation 
Rosa × damascena is optimally cultivated in hedge rows to help protect the blooms from wind damage and to facilitate harvesting them. In Bulgaria, damask roses are grown in long hedges, while in Turkey, individual plants are spaced apart along trenches. Gathering the flowers is intense manual labor. The harvesting period for roses is dependent on weather conditions and locations: between as long as a month in cooler conditions, or as short as 16-20 days in hotter seasons.

Rose oil

Iran, Bulgaria and Turkey are the major producers of rose oil from the different cultivars of Rosa × damascena. France and India also contribute significantly to the world market.

The cultivation of the "Bulgarian rose" as Rosa × damascena has been developed since Roman times. It is cultivated for commercial use in an area in the vicinity of Kazanlak and Karlovo in Bulgaria called the "Valley of Roses". The distillate from these roses is called "Bulgarian rose oil" and "Bulgarian rose otto". While families still operate their own small distilleries and produce what is denominated "village oil", the commercialization of rose oil as a high quality product is carefully regulated by a state cooperative in the Isparta region of Turkey. The roses are still grown by the small family farms but the flowers are brought to stills established and regulated by the cooperative for distillation and quality control.

Culinary uses
Damask roses are used in cooking as a flavouring ingredient or spice. They are an ingredient in the spice mixture denominated ras el hanout. Rose water and powdered roses are used in Middle Eastern and Indian cuisine. Rose water is often sprinkled on meat dishes, while rose powder is added to sauces. Chicken with rose is a popular dish in Middle Eastern cuisine. Whole flowers, or petals, are also used in the herbal tea zuhurat. The most popular use, however, is in the flavoring of desserts such as ice cream, jam, Turkish delights, rice pudding, yogurt, etc.

For centuries, the Damask rose has symbolized beauty and love. The fragrance of the rose has been captured and preserved in the form of rose water by a method that can be traced to ancient times in the Middle East and later to the Indian subcontinent.

Modern Western cookery does not use roses or rose water much. However, it was a popular ingredient in ancient times and continued to be popular well into the Renaissance. It was most commonly used in desserts, and still is a flavour in traditional desserts such as marzipan or turrón.  It has seen some revival in television cooking in the twenty-first century.

See also
Miracle of the roses

References

External links

Gernot Katzer's Spice Dictionary - Damask Rose
Rosa harvesting in Meimand; Photos.
Roses of Constantinople - Damask Rose Kazanlik

Herbs
Spices
Medicinal plants
Flora of Pakistan
Hybrid plants
damascena
Taxa named by Philip Miller